Argyle International Airport   (often referred to as Argyle Airport or simply AIA) is an international airport on the island of Saint Vincent in the Caribbean nation of Saint Vincent and the Grenadines.

The airport is one of St. Vincent and the Grenadines' most important infrastructure assets and the country's first international airport.  It is the largest international gateway into the country and connects St. Vincent and the Grenadines to major airports such as Miami International Airport, John F. Kennedy International Airport, Toronto Pearson International Airport, London Heathrow Airport as well as other airports in the Caribbean.

It is the largest of five airports in the multi-island nation of St. Vincent and the Grenadines, the others being J. F. Mitchell Airport in Bequia, Canouan Airport, Mustique Airport and Union Island Airport, all in the Grenadines.  Argyle International Airport serves as a major gateway to the Grenadines, with several airlines operating an extensive network of direct domestic flights from AIA to all destinations in the Grenadines.

The airport is the second solar powered airport in the Caribbean, following V. C. Bird International Airport in Antigua.

History 

The project broke ground on 13 August 2008, with a work team of Vincentians and Cubans (nicknamed the "Chatoyer-Che Contingent" by Vincentian Prime Minister Ralph Gonsalves), and the airport officially opened on 14 February 2017 when a Dynamic Airways charter flight became the first international aircraft to touch down at Argyle. The Argyle International Airport replaced the much smaller E.T. Joshua Airport as St. Vincent and the Grenadines’ principal airport. During the construction of the new airport, the International Airport Development Company (IADC) faced numerous challenges and controversies, causing major delays in the construction process. This resulted in the airport being completed five years after the originally forecasted completion date.

Argyle International Airport (AIA) was built on expropriated land in a rural part of St. Vincent's southeast coast, in response to the growing airport traffic needs that the E.T. Joshua Airport could not accommodate and also, because the latter had reached its saturation point with no physical space for further growth. The new airport is able to handle 1.5 million passengers per year, more than four times the capacity at E.T. Joshua and offers 23 commercial spaces, three restaurants and several spots for kiosks. The airport is expected to increase the accessibility to this multi-island destination and be a key economic driver for the country, attracting direct flights from Canada, the US, the UK and more, fueling investments.

The airport commenced full operations on 14 February 2017, replacing the decommissioned E.T. Joshua Airport. Argyle International Airport is the only airport in St. Vincent and the Grenadines that offers international scheduled flights and is also served by scheduled, low-fare, business and charter carriers, with many services operated to the U.S. and Canada. It also supports corporate and general aviation. Argyle International Airport is the largest capital project in the history of the country, with an estimated cost of construction of XCD$700 million (USD$259 million) and an actual estimated value in excess of XCD$1 billion.

Operations
The airport is a primary hub for SVG Air, a national airline of St. Vincent and the Grenadines, along with Mustique Airways. SVG Air and Mustique Airways have combined to form a SVG Air-Grenadine Air Alliance, operating 17 aircraft, with bases in St. Vincent, Antigua and Grenada. Offering visitors and residents a wider choice of International Gateways in and out of St. Vincent & the Grenadines. Numerous inter-island flights are available daily.

Air Canada Rouge, American Airlines, Caribbean Airlines, Sunwing Airlines, SVG Air, Mustique Airways and One Caribbean currently provide regularly scheduled passenger services at Argyle International Airport. EasySky, which began flying to St. Vincent from Havana, Cuba in June 2017, is currently in negotiations with authorities to recommence its twice weekly service. Argyle International Airport has non-stop flights to Canada and the United States. The airport receives many international charter flights and is also an important freight airport, which provides cold storage and standard cargo transport. Amerijet International, increased their airlift capacity, using larger aircraft such as the Boeing 767-300 to move more cargo into and out of St. Vincent and the Grenadines.

The busiest international routes are Toronto and New York, while the busiest regional routes remain Barbados and Trinidad. One Caribbean has filed an application for a Foreign Air Carrier Permit with the US Department of Transportation (USDOT) ahead of plans to offer ad hoc charter flights to any point(s) in the United States from St. Vincent & the Grenadines and other OECS (Organisation of Eastern Caribbean States) countries.

The following airlines operate regular scheduled, charter flights, domestic and international flights to and from Argyle International Airport:

Airlines and destinations

Passenger

Notes:

: Virgin Atlantic flights between London Heathrow and St Vincent-Argyle (in both directions) make a stop in Barbados. However, the airline does not have traffic rights to transport passengers solely between St Vincent-Argyle and Barbados.

Cargo

Statistics

Incidents and accidents 
29 August 2018  – Caribbean Airlines Boeing 737-85P (WL) flight BW552 suffered a suspected bird strike and subsequent engine vibrations after takeoff from Argyle International Airport (AIA), St. Vincent and the Grenadines on a flight to John F Kennedy International Airport, New York City. The flight crew decided to divert to the home base at Piarco International Airport, Trinidad and Tobago. A safe landing was made at Piarco International Airport at 14:35 UTC, 65 minutes after takeoff, where it was taken out of service for maintenance by the airline's engineers. The airline says passengers on flight BW552 were re-accommodated on a later service to JFK International Airport.
26 August 2019  – A Saab 340 aircraft belonging to One Caribbean, apparently developed issues while departing from Argyle International Airport for Piarco International Airport in Trinidad and Tobago and skidded off the runway. The aircraft was not damaged and there were no injuries to the passengers.
June 5, 2021 - American Airlines flight 1427 to Miami had to return to Argyle because of a bird strike. No one was reported injured in the aircraft, a Boeing 737-800. The incident was caught live by an aircraft spotter on video.

Controversy 
Some observers have questioned whether St. Vincent and the Grenadines needs an international airport. If it does, they ask, can the country afford to build – and maintain – an international airport while running an EC$151 million deficit as of February 2016. All of this was with public sector expenses increasing (Prime Minister Gonsalves announced in parliament in January 2016 that wages and salaries for central government employees would experience a "huge increase" in 2016 by 7.3 million EC dollars), taking the total to EC $281.8 million. The government also owes the private sector nearly 100 million East Caribbean dollars.

The new airport was originally scheduled to open in 2011. As of February 2016 the project has cost in excess of EC $729 million with increases in costs expected and has suffered from many delays. Paving on the runway was still incomplete as of February 2016.

In a "historic" address on 8 August 2005, Prime Minister Gonsalves stated, "Foreign investors often shy away from St. Vincent and the Grenadines when the limitations of air access arise due to the absence of an international airport." Critics have responded saying that the prime minister's statement is invalid and incorrect: on the contrary, many foreign concerns have invested in St. Vincent and the Grenadines from as early as the 1960s, after the Arnos Vale airport was constructed (and later renamed in memory of E.T. Joshua).

See also

 Grenadine Islands
 List of airlines of Saint Vincent and the Grenadines
 List of airports in Saint Vincent and the Grenadines
 List of airports in the Caribbean
List of flying boats and floatplanes
 Saint Vincent and the Grenadines
 Sustainable development
 Transport in Saint Vincent and the Grenadines

References

Further reading

IADC – Argyle International Airport: St. Vincent And The Grenadines Brand New Gateway – 21 May 2016: International Airport Development Company, Ltd.
 An Apex Moment: From Diamond Airstrip to Argyle International – Commemorative magazine – 14 February 2017: Published by Interactive Media Limited, SVG.
 
 Argyle International Airport: Pointing The Direction For A Small Caribbean Nation – 4 June 2018: The Sustainable Business Review.
 Argyle International Airport: Goods And Passengers – 17 September 2018: Business View Caribbean.
 interCaribbean Airways | interCaribbean announces new flights from between Barbados St Lucia, St Vincent and the Grenadines and Dominica

External links

 Official website

Airports in Saint Vincent and the Grenadines
Airports established in 2017
2017 establishments in North America